Ternopil International Airport (also known as Ternopol Airport)  is an airport in Ukraine located 8 km southeast of Ternopil. It services medium-sized airliners. The airport is relatively small and has a simple taxiway/tarmac layout owing to its size.

The airport does not currently have any scheduled flights, the last one being a Ternopil-Kyiv-Zhuliany route operated by Motor Sich Airlines from 31 May until 2 July 2010.

See also
 List of airports in Ukraine
 List of the busiest airports in Ukraine

References

External links
Airport website

Airports built in the Soviet Union
Airports in Ukraine
Economy of Ternopil